The Campuses of Fordham University are located within New York City and the New York City metropolitan area. The university's original Rose Hill campus is located in The Bronx on Fordham Road, while the Lincoln Center campus is located in Manhattan, one block west of Columbus Circle. The Westchester campus is located in Harrison, New York in Westchester County. Fordham University also maintains a campus in the Clerkenwell district of London and field offices in Spain and South Africa.

Rose Hill Campus
The Rose Hill campus is Fordham's original campus, established in 1841 by bishop John Hughes. It is home to Fordham College at Rose Hill, the Gabelli School of Business, and a division of the School of Professional and Continuing Studies, as well as the Graduate Schools of Arts and Sciences and Religion and Religious Education. It is the largest of Fordham's three campuses, comprising  in the central Bronx; it is also among the largest privately owned green spaces in New York City, situated just north of the Belmont neighborhood on Fordham Road. The original land comprised , but the university sold 30 acres east of Southern Boulevard to the New York City government to become part of the New York Botanical Garden.

Buildings

Academic and administrative

Athletic and outdoor sports facilities

Residential halls

Church facilities

Churches

Chapels

Other facilities

Lincoln Center Campus
In 1954, Robert Moses proposed that Fordham might "be interested in an alternative [to renting space in the New York Coliseum]” involving a new building in a part of the area to the north of Columbus Circle to be redeveloped. In March 1958, Mayor Robert Wagner signed the deeds transferring the Lincoln Center campus to Fordham University.

The Lincoln Center campus is home to Fordham College at Lincoln Center and a division of the School of Professional and Continuing Studies, as well as the School of Law, the Graduate Schools of Education and Social Service, and the Fordham School of Business. The  campus occupies the area from West 60th Street to West 62nd Street between Columbus and Amsterdam Avenues, placing it in the cultural heart of Manhattan. Lincoln Center has two grassy plazas, built one level up from the street. The larger expanse was once a barren cement landscape known as "Robert Moses Plaza;" the smaller is known as "St. Peter's Garden" and contains a memorial to the Fordham students and alumni who perished in the September 11, 2001 attacks.

Buildings

Academic and administrative

Residence halls

Church facilities

Westchester Campus
The Westchester campus is a single, 62,500-square-foot building located in west Harrison, New York. It serves as a branch campus for multiple programs offered at both Rose Hill and Lincoln Center.

London Centre Campus
In October 2018, Fordham expanded its study abroad program in London to its own space, the London Centre. The campus is 17,000 square feet of property housed in the Clerkenwell district in the borough of Camden. It features a student centre, a rooftop terrace, a learning resource centre, and a performance floor dedicated to the Drama program. The London Centre offers programs in business, theater, and the liberal arts to students from Fordham and other colleges and universities.

See also
Louis Calder Center
Fordham Preparatory School

References

Works cited

External links

Fordham University official site

Fordham University
Lists of university and college buildings in the United States
University and college campuses in New York (state)